Christian Oswaldo Molina Sorto (born 28 April 1998) is a Salvadoran footballer who last played as a midfielder for Richmond Kickers in USL League One.

Career

Youth, college and amateur
Molina was part of the Houston Dynamo academy.

Molina played four years of college soccer at Northern Illinois University between 2016 and 2019. During his time with the Huskies, Molina made 59 appearances, scoring 3 goals and tallying 7 assists, and earned All-Mid-America Conference honors.

During college, Molina also played in the USL League Two with Brazos Valley Cavalry between 2017 and 2019.

Professional
On January 14, 2020, Molina signed with USL League One side Union Omaha. He made his professional debut on August 1, 2020, appearing as an 63rd-minute substitute in a 1–0 win over North Texas SC.

On 15 February 2022, Molina signed with USL League One club Richmond Kickers. At the end of the 2022 season, his contract option was declined by the Kickers.

International
Molina has won a single cap for El Salvador U23's, appearing as a 55th-minute substitute in a 6–1 loss to the United States U23 on 16 November 2019.

References

External links
Christian Molina – Men's Soccer at NIU

1998 births
Association football midfielders
Brazos Valley Cavalry FC players
Expatriate soccer players in the United States
Northern Illinois Huskies men's soccer players
Living people
People from Katy, Texas
Richmond Kickers players
Salvadoran footballers
Salvadoran expatriate footballers
Soccer players from Texas
Union Omaha players
USL League One players
USL League Two players